Allamuchy is an unincorporated community and census-designated place (CDP) located within Allamuchy Township, in Warren County, New Jersey, United States. As of the 2010 United States Census, the CDP's population was 74.

As of the 2000 United States census, the area of the current CDP was part of the Allamuchy-Panther Valley CDP, which had a 2000 Census population of 3,125. As of the 2010 Census, the CDP was split into Allamuchy CDP and Panther Valley (2010 population of 3,327).

Geography
According to the United States Census Bureau, Allamuchy CDP had a total area of 0.082 square miles (0.211 km2), including 0.081 square miles (0.209 km2) of land and 0.001 square miles (0.001 km2) of water (0.68%).

Demographics

Census 2010

References

Allamuchy Township, New Jersey
Census-designated places in Warren County, New Jersey